Red Bull Powertrains, abbreviated as RBPT, is a Formula One power unit manufacturing company owned by the Austrian Red Bull GmbH. However, Honda continued to support the Red Bull owned teams in 2022 and will do so until the end of 2025. Honda assembles the power units and provide trackside and race operation support. The power units remain Honda's intellectual property, and due to a development freeze, Red Bull Powertrains will not develop them.

Red Bull Powertrains will take full responsibility for engine supply and operations from 2026, when the company will be renamed to "Red Bull Ford Powertrains", following a partnership with Ford.

History 
In February 2021, Red Bull Advanced Technologies signed an exclusive distribution agreement for Formula One engines with Honda to start in the 2022 season, after the Japanese automaker left Formula One at the end of the 2021 season. The engines will be purchased and renamed Red Bull Powertrains, and supplied to its two teams currently competing in Formula One, Red Bull Racing and AlphaTauri, starting in 2022. The presence of Red Bull Powertrains from 2022 onwards marked the first time an independent engine manufacturer participated in Formula One since Cosworth in 2013.
 
On 23 April 2021 Red Bull Powertrains announced the hiring of Ben Hodgkinson as technical director; Hodgkinson had been head of mechanical engineering at Mercedes AMG High Performance Powertrains since 2017, and had worked at the Brixworth factory for 20 years. On 6 May 2021, Red Bull Racing announced the hiring of five more senior Mercedes engine employees: Steve Blewett (who will be the production director of the Red Bull power unit), Omid Mostaghimi (chief engine, electronics and energy recovery), Pip Clode (head of mechanical design for energy recovery), Anton Mayo (head of combustion power unit design) and Steve Brodie (leader of combustion engine operations). On 2 October 2022, Honda announced the extension of their technical support to Red Bull Racing until 2025. Honda's agreement with Red Bull Racing does not involve power unit development. Honda's logo will also appear on Red Bull Racing's and AlphaTauri's car from the 2022 Japanese Grand Prix onwards.

On 3 February 2023, Red Bull Racing and Ford Motor Company announced a strategic partnership that will see Ford return to Formula One in 2026 following new engine regulations. Ford will provide "expertise in areas including battery cell and electric motor technology as well as power unit control software and analytics" and "combustion engine development," and the company will be renamed to "Red Bull Ford Powertrains."

Formula One engine results 
(key)

Notes

† – Retired before completion, but classified as more than 90% of the race distance was completed.

References 

Formula One engine manufacturers
Red Bull Racing